Roderick Demond Manuel (born October 8, 1974) is a former American football defensive end who played two seasons with the Pittsburgh Steelers of the National Football League (NFL). He was drafted by the Steelers in the sixth round of the 1997 NFL Draft and was drafted by Cleveland Browns in the 1999 expansion draft. He played college football at the University of Oklahoma and attended Western Hills High School in Benbrook, Texas. He was also a member of the Grand Rapids Rampage and Los Angeles Avengers of the Arena Football League (AFL).

References

External links

Just Sports Stats

Living people
1974 births
Players of American football from Fort Worth, Texas
American football defensive ends
African-American players of American football
Oklahoma Sooners football players
Pittsburgh Steelers players
Cleveland Browns players
Grand Rapids Rampage players
Los Angeles Avengers players
21st-century African-American sportspeople
20th-century African-American sportspeople